Ratu Penaia Kadavulevu (? – 1914) was the son of Ratu Epeli Nailatikau, upon whose death in 1901 he inherited the title of Vunivalu of Bau, the paramount chief of the Kubuna Confederacy of Fiji. The school Ratu Kadavulevu School was founded by him

Ratu Penaia was a parliamentarian in the Legislative Council of Fiji.

Sports
Ratu Kadavulevu was a talented and keen cricketer and represented Fiji in the sport.  Kadavulevu made six first-class appearances for Fiji in 1895 when they toured New Zealand in 1895.  In his six first-class matches on that tour, he took 5 wickets at an average of 17.40, with best figures of 3/30.  With the bat, he scored 52 runs at a low batting average of 4.72, with a high score of 25.

In 1908, Ratu Kadavulevu was invited by Melbourne Savage Club, Vice President, John Huson Marden,to bring a team of Fijian cricketers to Australia, where they played a match against the Savage members at the East Melbourne Cricket Ground.  That evening, the Savage Club, entertained the Fijian visitors at a black tie 'Smoke Night', which they attended in national dress, sang national songs, performed the meke wau dance and conducted a kava ceremony.<4><Joseph Johnson, Laughter and the Love of Friends, The Melbourne Savage Club, 1994, pp.89,90>

Regnal Title

Colonial Administrative Offices

References

 S. Berwick, Who's Who in Fiji, Berwick Publishing House, 1990

Fijian chiefs
Vunivalu of Bau
Tui Kaba
1914 deaths
Year of birth missing
I-Taukei Fijian members of the Legislative Council of Fiji
Politicians from Bau (island)
Fijian cricketers
20th-century Oceanian people